Christian García González (born 4 February 1999) is an Andorran footballer who plays as a centre-back for UE Santa Coloma and the Andorra national team.

Career
García made his international debut for Andorra on 17 November 2020 in the UEFA Nations League against Latvia, being sent off with a second yellow card in the closing moments of the match.

Career statistics

International

References

External links
 BDFutbol profile
 
 

1999 births
Living people
People from Andorra la Vella
Andorran footballers
Andorra youth international footballers
Andorra under-21 international footballers
Andorra international footballers
Andorran expatriate footballers
Andorran expatriate sportspeople in Spain
Expatriate footballers in Spain
Association football central defenders
FC Andorra players
FC Ordino players
FC Santa Coloma players
AD Alcorcón B players
Primera Divisió players